Fred Olhorn (died 26 August 2004) was a German judo athlete, who competed for the SC Dynamo Hoppegarten / Sportvereinigung (SV) Dynamo. In 1982, he won the European bronze medal.

References 

Year of birth missing
2004 deaths
German male judoka
Place of birth missing
20th-century German people